Douglas Clark Mayberry (born March 23, 1937) is a former American football player who played with the Minnesota Vikings and Oakland Raiders. He played college football at Utah State University and the University of California, Berkeley.

References

1937 births
Living people
American football fullbacks
California Golden Bears football players
Utah State Aggies football players
Minnesota Vikings players
Oakland Raiders players
Players of American football from California
People from Colusa County, California
American Football League players